Wilfred Smith (28 March 1910 – after 1935) was an English professional footballer. He played as a full back.

Blackpool
Smith made his sole appearance for Blackpool in a 4–2 defeat to West Bromwich Albion at Bloomfield Road on 3 September 1932.

References
Specific

General

1910 births
Year of death missing
Footballers from Sheffield
English footballers
Association football defenders
Blackpool F.C. players
Rotherham United F.C. players
Burnley F.C. players
Crystal Palace F.C. players
English Football League players